Glimp (also Glimpville) is an unincorporated community in Lauderdale County, Tennessee, United States. The community is located along Tennessee State Route 87 northwest of Henning.

Notes

Unincorporated communities in Lauderdale County, Tennessee
Unincorporated communities in Tennessee